Mr. Sleeman Is Coming is a 1917 one-act play by the Swedish author Hjalmar Bergman. The main character is an orphaned young woman who is about to be married off to an unappealing but rich old man, Mr. Sleeman, at the instigation of her aunts who have taken charge of her. Bergman infuses the situation with overtones of rueful pessimism concerning life in general.

The play is one of his most successful pieces of theatre and has been staged many times in Sweden and also on Swedish television. In 1957, Ingmar Bergman directed the first TV adaptation.

Cast
 Bibi Andersson as Anne-Marie
 Jullan Kindahl as Mrs. Mina
 Yngve Nordwall as Mr. Sleeman
 Max von Sydow as The hunter
 Naima Wifstrand as Mrs. Gina

References

External links

1957 films
1950s Swedish-language films
1957 drama films
Swedish black-and-white films
Swedish television films
Films directed by Ingmar Bergman
1950s Swedish films